Kehr is a surname, and may refer to:

 Dave Kehr (born 1953), American film critic
 Diego Paulsen Kehr (born 1987), Chilean politician
 Ernest Anthony Kehr (1911–1986), American philatelist
 Eckart Kehr, (1902–1933), German historian
 Edward C. Kehr (1837–1918), American politician and lawyer
 Günter Kehr (1920–1989), German violinist and teacher
 Hans Kehr, Johannes Otto Kehr, (1862–1916), German surgeon and professor
 Paul Fridolin Kehr, (1860–1944), German historian (see Paul Fridolin Kehr)
 Rick Kehr, Karl Richard Kehr, American football player, b. 1959

See also
Kehr's sign
Kerr (disambiguation)

German toponymic surnames